Cordylancistrus torbesensis is a species of catfish in the family Loricariidae. It is native to South America, where it occurs in the Torbes River basin, which is part of the Apure River drainage in Venezuela. The species reaches 6.5 cm (2.6 inches) SL and it is named for the river basin in which it can be found.

References 

Ancistrini
Fish described in 1944